Dunadach mac Cú Connacht (died 1032) was King of Síol Anmchadha.

Biography

His obituary in the Irish annals state that he was slain. No details are given.

References
 O'Madáin: History of the O'Maddens of Hy-Many, Gerard Madden, 2004. .

People from County Galway
11th-century Irish monarchs
1032 deaths
Year of birth unknown